Quonset Hut Studio was a music recording studio established in 1954 in Nashville, Tennessee by brothers Harold and Owen Bradley as Bradley's Film & Recording Studios and later operated as Columbia Studio B. The Quonset Hut was the first commercial recording studio in what would later become known as Music Row. It is now a recording classroom for Belmont University.

History
In 1954, producer Owen Bradley, along with his brother Harold Bradley, purchased a house at 804 16th Avenue South in Nashville for $7500 to convert into a film and recording studio. The Bradleys tore out the first floor of the house to create recording space in the basement. They also attached a surplus Army Quonset hut that they bought to the back of the house to use as a television studio for filming musical performances. The original Studio A was inside the house.

In 1958, the basement space became too crowded and the recording end of the Studios moved into the Quonset Hut, which became Studio B. The recording facility was an instant success, attracting business from the Decca, Columbia, Capitol, and Mercury labels. The Bradleys sold the studio to Columbia Records in 1962, and both would later work with Chet Atkins on building RCA Studio A.

Columbia Records operated the studio from 1962 through 1982, when it was converted into office space. In 2006, philanthropist Mike Curb bought the structure and had it restored. Today it serves as a recording classroom for Belmont University. In 1965, a new studio, which measured 58 feet by 37 feet wide, and was 25 feet high, was planned. It opened on 22 October,1965, as the new Studio A. The old Studio was demolished during the constrution of the new one. Studio A was reopened as a recording classroom for Belmont University in 2014.

Notable recordings
Patsy Cline's "Crazy", Brenda Lee's "I'm Sorry" and Bobby Vinton's "Blue Velvet" were produced at the recording studio, and artists across different genres including Tammy Wynette, Johnny Cash, the Byrds, Elvis Costello, Gene Vincent and Simon & Garfunkel recorded music there.

References

Recording studios in Tennessee
Companies based in Nashville, Tennessee